Oh Maane Maane is a 1984 Indian Tamil-language romance film directed by A. Jagannathan. The film stars Mohan and Urvashi. It is a remake of the 1974 Malayalam film Chattakari, which itself was based on a Malayalam novel of the same name. The film was released on 22 October 1984.

Plot

Cast 
Mohan as Mahesh
Urvashi as Stella
Thengai Srinivasan as George
Sivachandran as Joseph
Calcutta Viswanathan
Vennira Aadai Moorthy as Sivaraman
Vadivukkarasi as Victoria
Manorama
Vasantha as Meenakshi
Sangeeta
Arundhathi as Kasthuri

Soundtrack 
The music composed by Ilaiyaraaja. Lyrics written by Vaali, Vairamuthu, Gangai Amaran, Na. Kamarasan and Mu. Metha. Kamal Haasan recorded a song in his voice for the film.

Reception 
Kalki felt the film was not as great as the original film Chattakari and panned Jagannathan's direction but praised Ilaiyaraaja's music and concluded that theatre owners should be warned that if seats are torn, fans are not responsible for it.

References

External links 
 

1980s romance films
1980s Tamil-language films
1984 films
Films directed by A. Jagannathan
Films scored by Ilaiyaraaja
Indian romance films
Tamil remakes of Malayalam films